
Prince James may refer to:
James I of Scotland (1394–1437)
James II of Scotland (1430–1460)
James III of Scotland (1451/52–1488)
James IV of Scotland (1473–1513)
James V of Scotland (1512–1543)
James I of England (1566–1625)
James II of England (1633–1701)
James Francis Edward Stuart "The Old Pretender" (1688–1766) son of the deposed James II of England, and as such laid claim to the English and Scottish thrones
The Earl of Wessex (b. 2007), grandson of Elizabeth II, whose princely status is a matter of dispute.